Ladislav Onofrej  (born 20 September 1977 in Košice) is retired Slovak footballer who played as a midfielder.

External links
 Player profile 

1977 births
Living people
Slovak footballers
ŠK Slovan Bratislava players
FC VSS Košice players
Czech First League players
FK Drnovice players
SK Sigma Olomouc players
1. HFK Olomouc players
Slovak Super Liga players
Association football midfielders
Sportspeople from Košice
Expatriate footballers in the Czech Republic